The 1965 Open Championship was the 94th Open Championship, played 7–9 July at Royal Birkdale Golf Club in Southport, England. Peter Thomson won his fifth Claret Jug, two strokes ahead of runners-up Brian Huggett and Christy O'Connor Snr. Thomson's previous Open victory was seven years earlier in 1958.

The 1965 Open was the last to conclude with two rounds on Friday. Beginning in 1966, the final round was moved from Friday afternoon to Saturday. The Open used this schedule until 1980, when the first round moved to Thursday with the final round on Sunday, the same as the other three majors.

Field
The exemption categories were:

1. The first 20 and those tying for 20th place in the 1964 Open

2. The first 30 and those tying for 30th place in the P.G.A. Order of Merit for 1964

3. The last 10 Open champions (1955–64)

4. The last 5 Amateur champions (1960–64)

5. The last 10 U.S. Open champions (1955–64)

6. The last 5 U.S. Amateur champions (1960–64)

7. The first 30 money winners and those tying for 30th place in the U.S.P.G.A. official list for one year ending with the P.G.A. tournament immediately before the closing date of the U.S. Open entries

8. Members of the 1964 Great Britain and Ireland Eisenhower Cup team

9. Senior professional champions of Great Britain and the United States
Charlie Ward, Sam Snead

10. The 1965 U.S. Open champion
The U.S. Open took place after the final date for entries. The winner, Gary Player, was already exempt.

Source:

Qualification took place on 2–3 July at Hillside and Southport and Ainsdale. They were run as two separate events with 41 players to qualify from Hillside, 40 from Southport and Ainsdale, together with 49 exemptions to make a total field of 130. Clive Clark was later added to field after William C. Campbell failed to arrive. M.E. Hill also played after Frank Phillips withdrew.

Prize money
The total prize money was increased from £8,500 to £10,000. The winner's share was increased to £1,750 with £1,250 for second, £1,000 for third, £750 for fourth, £600 for fifth, £450 for sixth, £375 for seventh.

Course

Source:
Lengths of the course for previous Opens:
 1961:    
 1954:

Past champions in the field

Made the cut

Source:

Missed the cut

Source:

Round summaries

First round
Wednesday, 7 July 1965

Source:

Second round
Thursday, 8 July 1965

Source:
Amateurs: Carr (-4), Bonallack (+1), Burgess (+1), Clark (+4), Hadlock (+6), Shade (+6),Foster (+7), Marsh (+7), Glover (+8), Birtwell (+9), Richards (+15), Marks (+17), McCandlish (+17)

Third round
Friday, 9 July 1965 - (morning)

Source:

Final round
Friday, 9 July 1965 - (afternoon)
 
Source:
Amateurs: Burgess (+7), Bonallack (+10), Carr (+10)

References

External links
Royal Birkdale 1965 (Official site)

The Open Championship
Golf tournaments in England
Open Championship
Open Championship
Open Championship